Viktor Leonidovich Navochenko (born 21 August 1970) is a Russian professional football coach and a former player. He is the manager of FC Salyut Belgorod.

Playing career
As a player, he made his debut in the Soviet Second League in 1988 for Salyut Belgorod.

He made his Russian Premier League debut for FC Tekstilshchik Kamyshin on 8 March 1993 in a game against FC Luch Vladivostok. He played 8 seasons in the RPL for Tekstilshchik, FC Baltika Kaliningrad, PFC CSKA Moscow and FC Saturn Ramenskoye.

Honours

Player
 Russian Premier League bronze: 1999.
 Russian Cup finalist: 2000 (played in the early stages of the 1999/2000 tournament for CSKA).

Coach
 Russian Professional Football League Zone Center best coach: 2016–17.

European club competitions
 UEFA Cup 1994–95 with FC Tekstilshchik Kamyshin: 4 games.
 UEFA Intertoto Cup 1998 with FC Baltika Kaliningrad: 6 games.

References

1970 births
People from Valuysky District
Living people
Russian people of Ukrainian descent
Soviet footballers
Russian footballers
Association football midfielders
Russian football managers
FC Salyut Belgorod players
FC Tekstilshchik Kamyshin players
Russian Premier League players
FC Baltika Kaliningrad players
PFC CSKA Moscow players
FC Saturn Ramenskoye players
FC Elista players
FC Fakel Voronezh players
FC Volgar Astrakhan players
FC Dynamo Bryansk players
Sportspeople from Belgorod Oblast